Diana Vaisman (or Weissman, ; born 23 July 1998) is a Belarusian-born Israeli track and field athlete and sprinter. She holds the Israeli national record in the 100 metre sprint.

Early and personal life
Vaisman was born in Minsk, Belarus, to Irena and Vladimir Vaisman. Her family immigrated to Israel with her, when she was two years old. They reside in Ashkelon, Israel. Her mother Irina Vaisman is a former athlete and a current coach, and coaches her as does Irina Lenskiy. Vaisman's family is of Ashkenazi Jewish descent.

She was enlisted and served as a soldier in the Israel Defense Forces.

She married her Israeli boyfriend Max Shvarzman on 7 April 2022.

Running career
Vaisman's club is Maccabi Rishon LeZion.

60 metres
Vaisman represented Israel in the 60 metres at two European Athletics Indoor Championships, in 2017 and 2019, reaching the semifinals on the second occasion. In February 2018 she won a bronze medal in the 60 m sprint with a time of 7.49 at the 2018 Balkan Athletics Indoor Championships in Istanbul, Turkey. In January 2019 at the 2019 Mediterranean Athletics U23 Indoor Championships in Miramas, France, she won a bronze medal in the 60 metres with a time of 7.45. In February 2019 she won a gold medal in the 60 m sprint with a time of 7.34 at the 2019 Balkan Athletics Indoor Championships in Istanbul.

100 metres
In July 2017 at the 2017 Maccabiah Games she set the Games record in the 100 m dash with a time of 11.71. In June 2018 at the 2018 Mediterranean Athletics U23 Championships in Jesolo, Italy, Vaisman won a silver medal in the 100 metres with a time of 11.59.

Vaisman is Israel's national record holder in the 100 metres (11.38 seconds), having in July 2018 at 19 years of age at the Israel Athletic Championship in Tel Aviv broken a long-standing 46-year record of Esther Roth-Shahamorov going back to the 1972 Summer Olympics. In June 2019 at the 2019 European Games, Vaisman set a new Israeli national record in the 100 metres, running it in 11:35 seconds. In July 2019 she ran the 100 metres in 11.27 at the 83rd Israel Athletic Championships, lowering her Israeli national record. In 2019, she competed in the women's 100 metres event at the 2019 World Athletics Championships held in Doha, Qatar. She did not qualify to compete in the semi-finals.

International competitions

Personal bests
Outdoor
100 metres – 11.27 (+0.5 m/s, Tel Aviv 2019)
200 metres – 23.78 (-0.9 m/s, Tel Aviv 2018)
Indoor
60 metres – 7.32 (Glasgow 2019)

See also
List of Israeli records in athletics
List of Maccabiah records in athletics

References

External links
 
 
 
 
 
 

1998 births
Living people
Israeli female sprinters
Belarusian people of Jewish descent
Belarusian emigrants to Israel
Israeli people of Belarusian-Jewish descent
People from Ashkelon
Athletes from Minsk
Competitors at the 2017 Maccabiah Games
Maccabiah Games gold medalists for Israel
Maccabiah Games medalists in athletics
Athletes (track and field) at the 2015 European Games
Olympic athletes of Israel
Athletes (track and field) at the 2020 Summer Olympics
Olympic female sprinters
Ashkenazi Jews
European Games competitors for Israel
World Athletics Championships athletes for Israel